TeXworks is free and open-source application software, available for Windows, Linux and macOS. It is a Qt-based graphical user interface to the TeX typesetting system and its LaTeX, ConTeXt, and XeTeX extensions. TeXworks is targeted at direct generation of PDF output. It has a built-in PDF viewer using the poppler library; the viewer has auto-refresh capability, and also features SyncTeX support (which allows the user to synchronize the PDF viewer position with the source, and vice versa with a single click).

The developer of TeXworks is Jonathan Kew (who also developed XeTeX), who deliberately modelled TeXworks on Richard Koch’s award-winning TeXShop software for macOS to lower the entry barrier to the TeX world for those using desktop operating systems other than macOS. Kew argued against complex user interfaces like that of TeXnicCenter or Kile, which he described as intimidating for new users.

TeXworks requires a TeX installation: TeX Live, MiKTeX, or MacTeX. MiKTeX 2.8 (and 2.9) comes bundled with TeXworks, even in the base installation.

One limitation of TeXworks is, that it does not by itself support multi-stage typesetting, like, for example, PNG or SVG output via intermediate DVI. This is a design choice, because such workflows are considered too advanced for the beginning user. The user has to write a shell or batch script to use such workflows with TeXworks.

Version history
 (Feb 2022) TeXworks 0.6.7 released
 (Mar 2021) TeXworks 0.6.6 released 
 (Mar 2020) TeXworks 0.6.5 released 
 (Mar 2020) TeXworks 0.6.4 released
 (Mar 2019) TeXworks 0.6.3 released
 (Apr 2017) TeXworks 0.6.2 released
 (May 2016) TeXworks 0.6.1 released
 (Apr 2016) TeXworks 0.6.0 released
 (Apr 2015) TeXworks 0.4.6 released 
 (Apr 2013) TeXworks 0.4.5 released  
 (Apr 2012) TeXworks 0.4.4 released  
 (Jun 2011) TeXworks 0.4.3 released 
 (Jun 2011) TeXworks 0.4.2 released  
 (May 2011) TeXworks 0.4.1 released  
 (Mar 2011) TeXworks 0.4.0 released 
 (Oct 2009) TeXworks 0.2.3 released 
 (Oct 2009) TeXworks 0.2.2 released 
 (Oct 2009) TeXworks 0.2.1 released 
 (Sep 2009) TeXworks 0.2.0 released

See also 

 Comparison of TeX editors
 XeTeX

References

External links 

 TeXworks – lowering the entry barrier to the TeX world
 TeX Users Group (Discuss the TeXworks front end)
 LaTeX-Community (Subforum for TeXworks)
 Search keyword "texworks" in all forums

Cross-platform free software
Free TeX editors
TeX editors
TeX editors that use Qt